Kristine Breistøl (born 23 August 1993) is a Norwegian handball player for Team Esbjerg and the Norwegian national team.

She also represented Norway in the 2011 Women's Junior European Handball Championship, placing 12th, and in the 2012 Women's Junior World Handball Championship, placing 8th. She played 37 matches and scored 100 goals for Norway's junior team.

Achievements
Olympic Games:
Bronze: 2020
World Championship:
Winner: 2021
European Championship:
Winner: 2020, 2022
EHF Cup:
Finalist: 2019
Norwegian Championship:
Winner: 2012/2013, 2013/2014, 2014/2015, 2015/2016
Norwegian Cup:
Winner: 2013, 2014, 2015, 2016
Danish League:
Gold Medalist: 2019, 2020
Danish Cup:
Bronze Medalist: 2018

References

External links

 
 
 Kristine Breistøl at the Norwegian Handball Federation 
 
 

1993 births
Living people
Handball players from Oslo
Norwegian female handball players
Expatriate handball players
Norwegian expatriate sportspeople in Denmark
Handball players at the 2020 Summer Olympics
Olympic bronze medalists for Norway
Medalists at the 2020 Summer Olympics
Olympic medalists in handball
Olympic handball players of Norway